The Lee Valley Reservoir Chain is located in the Lee Valley, and comprises 13 reservoirs that supply drinking water to London.

The Reservoir Chain is a major geographic constraint; together with the Thames it is one of the two significant topographic features that divide the capital and define the communities on either side. The Lower Lea Valley, downstream of the reservoirs, is more integrated, with better east–west transport connectivity.

Geographic significance

The Chain separates the London Boroughs of Haringey and Enfield to the west, from Waltham Forest and Essex in the east. The corridor includes 13 reservoirs, two to three channels of the Lee, as well as marshes and parkland, up to a mile wide.

During WWI, the settlements on both sides of the Lea were badly hit by Germany Army and Navy airship raids. It is believed the crews mistook the Reservoir Chain for the Thames and released their bombs on what they took to be central London.

The Boundary Commission treats the Thames and Lea as natural barriers within London. When reviewing the boundaries of London's parliamentary constituencies, it concludes that any constituency spanning either river would be artificial and not reflect local communities or identities. The 2018 review compromised on this, allowing a cross-Lea constituency further south, in the Lower Lea where the communities on each side are more integrated due to greater quantity and quality of the road and rail links across the valley.

The corridor is part of the Metropolitan Green Belt and its national and international significance for wildlife is reflected by SSSI, Ramsar and SPA designations. Lying between some of Londons's most densely populated areas, the Reservoir Chain and associated open land provides a highly valued ecological, landscape and recreational resource for the people of north and east London.

Reservoirs 

The following waters are located in the London Borough of Enfield and are known collectively as the Chingford Reservoirs, which are a Site of Special Scientific Interest:

King George V Reservoir
William Girling Reservoir

The following waters, together known as the Walthamstow Reservoirs, are located in the London Borough of Waltham Forest and, with the exception of one, form a Site of Special Scientific Interest:

Lockwood Reservoir
High Maynard Reservoir
Low Maynard Reservoir
East Warwick Reservoir
West Warwick Reservoir
 Unnamed reservoirs numbered 1 to 5
Banbury Reservoir (The only reservoir that is not part of a SSSI)
The reservoirs have the following characteristics:

Water supply 
The reservoirs are fed by the following waters:
River Lee Diversion
River Lee Flood Relief Channel
New River
 The Thames-Lee Water Main

Water treatment 
After being stored in the above reservoirs the water is piped to the Coppermills Water Treatment Works to be treated. In 2006 a smaller water treatment works was also built at Chingford at the edge of the William Girling and King George V reservoirs.

See also

 London water supply infrastructure
 Bomb Crater Pond (Walthamstow)

References

Thames Water reservoirs
Reservoirs in London